Boiler Room is an online music broadcaster and club promoter based in London, UK. It hosts predominantly dance music events, focusing on underground genres, in locations internationally, and broadcasts the shows live over the internet.

It has regular operations in London, Amsterdam, New York City, Berlin, Lisbon, São Paulo, Mexico City, Tokyo, Sydney, Lima and Los Angeles and produces about 30 to 35 new shows each month. By 2016, Boiler Room had hosted shows in around 100 cities worldwide. Its music programming originally focused on dance music such as garage, house, techno, dub but eventually expanded to include grime, hip hop, classical, and jazz.

History

Birth 

In March 2010 Blaise Bellville invited Gilles Peterson affiliate, Thristian "Thris Tian" Richards and Femi Adeyemi, the founder of NTS Radio, to record a mixtape for his online magazine platform. This led to the creation of Boiler Room. The name Boiler Room and initial idea came about from an over heard conversation in a bar in Hoxton Square. The first Boiler Room session was recorded using a webcam duct taped to the wall of a disused boiler room, and the session was broadcast live online on Ustream.

During this period, Boiler Room developed their format of filming a DJ facing the camera a projected visual backdrop of the Boiler Room logo overlaid on old rave video footage, with Time Out noting: "the artists are, after all, the sole attraction at Boiler Room: attendees are positioned behind the decks in a bedroom DJ style set-up so that the selector is always the main figure in view.".

2010–11: Expansion 

Boiler Room's first session in March 2010 turned into a weekly show, becoming a Ustream "Supported Channel" and getting widespread press recognition, with coverage from the BBC, Fader, Time Out, Hypetrak, and Dummy Magazine, who noted that "from a small room in Dalston to a globe-spanning brand, in just over a year Boiler Room has emerged as one of the most important broadcasters in underground music."

In its first year in 2010 Boiler Room featured performances from mostly electronic musicians and DJs including Theo Parrish, Jamie xx, SBTRKT, Hudson Mohawke, Jamie Woon, Mount Kimbie, Falty DL, James Blake, and Ben UFO. London based record labels Young Turks and Hessle Audio, as well as hip-hop collective Livin' Proof, hosted Boiler Room takeovers in 2010. Radiohead hosted a Boiler Room takeover in October 2011, featuring sets by Thom Yorke, Jamie xx, Caribou, Lone, and Illum Sphere.

Boiler Room first began international shows in August 2011 with a run hosted in Germany by Michail Stangl, a Russian-born music curator and DJ. Shortly thereafter, Boiler Room expanded in the United States, starting with broadcasts in Los Angeles headed up by Sofie Fatouretchi, an Austro-Iranian artist and musician.

Present day 
The early focus on the underground music scene and electronic music in London has broadened. Taking in hip hop, jazz, experimental, classical, world music and talk-based podcast formats.

2014 was defined by a push into classical music, launched with German prepared pianist Hauschka, and followed by broadcasts from St Johns Church in Hackney featured Japanese composer Ryuichi Sakamoto and Julia Holter. A broadcast within the Pula Arena in Croatia saw Nils Frahm perform.

The platform has partnered with music festivals including SXSW, Sónar, Dimensions, and Dekmantel.

Boiler Room launched in China with a show in Beijing in April 2016 followed by a show in Shanghai with Disclosure in May 2016.

Boiler Room's first full-length documentary, on Atlanta based collective Awful Records, launched in June 2016. Boiler Room has since continued producing TV shows and documentaries aimed at telling stories tied to the people, artists and culture. This includes shows like Gasworks, a 20-minute, grime-focused talk show starring Alhan Gençay & Poet

In 2018, Boiler Room launched '4:3', a platform for film, documentary and music videos, with Amar Ediriwira as its creative director. In 2019, the first 'Boiler Room Festival' was announced in Peckham, London.  The event showcased a different underground scene each day, across contemporary jazz, rap, and dance genres.

Despite posting a net operating loss of £6,633,752 in 2018 and a loss of £1,299,656 in 2019, Boiler Room controversially received £791,652 from Arts Council England via the Culture Recovery Fund scheme in October, 2020.

In 2021, ticketing platform DICE bought Boiler Room for an undisclosed sum, after raising $122 million.

Awards 
In 2018 Boiler Room received a number of award wins and nominations for its marketing and content:

4:3
 Gold Lovies – Best Music and Culture Platform
 Peoples Choice Lovies – Best Music and Culture Platform
 Digiday Media Awards – Best New Vertical
 The Drum DADI Awards – Best Digital Strategy
 The Drum DADI Awards – Best News Media Website
 Webbys – Best Music Website

System and Migrant Sound
 Webbys – Social Content Series & Campaigns – Migrant Sounds
 The Drum Content Awards – Best News Marketing Strategy – System – Highly Commended
 Drum Marketing Awards – Best Music and Entertainment Campaign – System
 The Drum Awards – Best Media Content Marketing Campaign – System

Contemporary Scenes
 Webbys – General Social-Music for Social – Contemporary Scenes

Individual and team awards
 The Drum Digerati – Stephen Mai (Top 100 in Digital)
 Campaign's Power 100 – Stephen Mai (Top 100 in Marketing)
 Jodie Nicholson – Alternative Power 100 Music List
 Video Team of the Year – Digiday Media Awards

Notable events 
A number of notable musicians and cultural organisations have worked with Boiler Room to celebrate key releases and other one-off events.
 Boiler Room broadcast Run the Jewels live in 360° format December 2015 before the technology was widely available.
 Richie Hawtin celebrated the release of his PLAYdifferently mixer with a Boiler Room show in May 2016 featuring a performance from Hawtin and Dubfire, as well as performances from Chris Liebing, Ellen Allien, Joseph Capriati, and others.
 DJ EZ's 24-hour DJ set on the 27 and 28 February 2016 which raised over £60,000 on behalf of Cancer Research UK was also broadcast live on Boiler Room.
 Skepta celebrated the release of album Konnichiwa with an album launch party arranged with and streamed by Boiler Room live from Tokyo in May 2016.
 Notting Hill Carnival's Rampage, Deviation, Aba Shanti-I, Channel One, Nasty Love, Saxon Sound, King Tubbys, Gladdy Wax and Disya Jeneration soundsystems were broadcast live by Boiler Room in August 2016, totalling 42 hours video coverage. Part of the live coverage was also broadcast by partners The Guardian, Time Out, Noisey, Thump, SB.TV, NTS Radio, and the Deviation and Rampage soundsystems.
 Fred Again made his Boiler Room debut in June 2022. His set amassed over 10 million views in the first 4 months on their YouTube channel, with many saying it's one of Boiler Room's most iconic performances of all time.

References

External links

Culture in Berlin
Culture in London
Electronic music organizations
Recurring events established in 2010
Dance music television channels
Live streaming services
Internet television channels